The Pushkin State Russian Language Institute is a public education centre in Moscow specializing in the teaching of Russian as a foreign language and offering a range of language courses on all levels. It is named after the Russian writer Alexander Pushkin.

History 
The Pushkin State Russian Language Institute was founded in 1966 as a part of Moscow State University. In 1973, it obtained its independence and in 1999 a Philological Department was established so that Russian native speakers can do bachelor’s (4 years), Master's (2 years) and Ph.D. (3 years) programmes in teaching Russian as a foreign language.

Location 
The Institute's address is Akademik Volgin Street, 6.
The nearest underground station is Belyayevo.

Courses 
The Pushkin State Russian Language Institute offers one month summer courses and one year or one term courses. Most of the participants are recruited through bilateral exchange programmes dating back to the Soviet era.
The Russian Embassy in Berlin reckons the Pushkin Institute among the officially recommended institutions for Russian language courses.

References

External links 
 

1966 establishments in the Soviet Union
Alexander Pushkin
Buildings and structures built in the Soviet Union
Buildings and structures completed in 1966
Education in the Soviet Union
Public universities and colleges in Russia
Universities and colleges in Moscow
Russian language
Second-language acquisition